Superball Music is a German independent record label, launched on 1 October 2007. Superball Myspace page states that

Superball have attracted significant attention for bringing out Oceansize's third album Frames, which was a commercial success, and for signing cult indie/alternative Texan band ...And You Will Know Us by the Trail of Dead, in advance of their upcoming album due in February 2009. The only other bands to have signed to Superball Music so far are German progressive bands The Amber Light, Caesars Rome, upcoming British act that penned the deal with Superball in October 2008, and released their début album The Company We Keep in 2012. Long Distance Calling, the Australian heavy-rock group Cog and British New Prog band Pure Reason Revolution, whose second album Amor Vincit Omnia was released as a two disk digipack by Superball on 9 March 2009.

Superball Music is a sister label to the German InsideOut Music and have the same Managing Director, Thomas Waber. In 2009 Superball and Inside Out became partners of Century Media Records, which secured a worldwide distribution contract with EMI. In September  2012, Bright Black Heaven was released  on Superball Music. Oceanography  released on Superball Music on March 2018.

Artists
65daysofstatic
...And You Will Know Us by the Trail of Dead
Blaqk Audio
Charlie Barnes
Cog
Dredg
Flood Of Red
InMe
Long Distance Calling
Matt Skiba And The Sekrets
Oceansize
Pure Reason Revolution
Amplifier
Maybeshewill
Toundra
Vennart
Three Trapped Tigers
Rooney

References

External links
 

German independent record labels
Alternative rock record labels